Dayang Group is a large clothing manufacturer headquartered in Dalian, Liaoning, China. Its CEO is Ms. Li Guilian.

Dayang has two main sources of business: it is a source of manufacturing for other clothing labels, including Ralph Lauren, BCBG Max Azria, and Macy's, and
it has an in-house brand Trands, a luxury menswear label. 
Dayang was founded in 1979.

External links
Dayang Trands website: Trands

Clothing companies of China
Clothing companies established in 1979
Manufacturing companies based in Dalian
Chinese companies established in 1979